Danny Balin (born April 9, 1982) is an American professional golfer.

Balin is a six-time PGA of America Metropolitan Section Player of the Year (2010, 2011, 2012, 2018, 2019, 2021), and the 2012, 2013 and 2021 New York State Open champion.

Balin has played in nine major championships including the 2010, 2011, 2012, 2013, 2018, 2019, 2020, and 2021 PGA Championships. In the 2020 U.S. Open at Winged Foot Golf Club, Michael O'Keefe, who played Danny Noonan in the movie Caddyshack, caddied for Balin in the practice rounds.

Balin played three seasons on PGA Tour Latinoamérica and won the 2015 Guatemala Stella Artois Open.

Originally from Rockville, Maryland, Balin currently resides in Westchester County, New York, with his wife and daughter, and is the head golf professional at Fresh Meadow Country Club.

Professional wins (8)

PGA Tour Latinoamérica wins (1)

*Note: The 2015 Guatemala Stella Artois Open was shortened to 54 holes due to weather.

Other wins (7)
2011 Metropolitan PGA Championship
2012 New York State Open, Metropolitan PGA Championship
2013 New York State Open, Metropolitan PGA Championship
2021 POLO Golf Met PGA Head Pro Championship, New York State Open

Results in major championships

CUT = missed the halfway cut
Note: Balin never played in the Masters Tournament or The Open Championship.

U.S. national team appearances
PGA Cup: 2011 (winners), 2019 (winners)

References

External links

American male golfers
PGA Tour Latinoamérica golfers
Golfers from Maryland
Golfers from New York (state)
Pennsylvania State University alumni
Sportspeople from Rockville, Maryland
1982 births
Living people